The 2022 Michigan Tech Huskies football team represented Michigan Tech University as a member of the Great Lakes Intercollegiate Athletic Conference (GLIAC) during the 2022 NCAA Division II football season. Led by sixth-year head coach Steve Olson, the Huskies compiled an overall record of 4–7 with a mark of 2–4 in conference play, placing fifth in the GLIAC. Michigan Tech played home games at Kearly Stadium in Houghton, Michigan.

Previous season
A season after not playing football in the 2020 season due to the GLIAC cancelling the season due to the ongoing COVID-19 pandemic, the Huskies participated in ten games in the 2021 season, going 6-4 overall and 5–2 in conference play.

Schedule

Personnel

Coaching staff

Game summaries

Wisconsin–Platteville

St. Thomas

Midwestern State

19. Saginaw Valley State

Davenport

Wayne State (MI)

Northern Michigan

7. Ferris State

Hillsdale

In a game where momentum was everything, Michigan Tech prepared for success. The Huskies got the first score of a game off a Will Ark 4-yard rushing touchdown. Each team exchanged a touchdown before Hillsdale nailed a 27-yard field goal as time expired in the second quarter.

Communication wasn't a big struggle but didn't serve the Huskies well in one of their 3rd quarter possessions, as there was a fumble in the beginning of a rushing play, scooped by a Charger and brought all 40 yards for a touchdown to give Michigan Tech their first deficit of the game. An early 4th quarter touchdown by Hillsdale made the Husky deficit a 2-possession deficit.

The Huskies didn't let that intimidate them, however, as they scored the last 14 points of the game, with their last touchdown being with a mere 40 seconds left of the game. That was enough time for Hillsdale to get within striking range, but that's where the Charger's luck ended because on a hail-mary pass with a few seconds left on the game clock, the Huskies intercepted the ball in the endzone. The Huskies then kneeled to secure their fourth win of the season and to force the Charger's fifth loss of the season.

Saginaw Valley State

In a low scoring first half, there were several big plays that could have swayed the momentum in favor of either team. With 11:28 left in the 1st Quarter, Michigan Tech got a Field Goal to make the game 3–0, then recovered a Lakers fumble 80 seconds later. The Huskies weren't able to do anything with it, however. In the 2nd Quarter, Michigan Tech turned the ball over with 9:46 left and, while on defense, had an Unsportsmanlike call against them with 8:20 left in the first half. This helped Saginaw Valley State's drive, as they continued down field for a Touchdown, giving them a 7–3 lead.

Will Ark threw an interception around a minute later, but was overturned by a controversial Defensive Pass Interference. This swayed the momentum to the Huskies, as they got a Touchdown with 2:25 left in the 1st Half. This gave plenty of time for SVSU to lead the game heading into the locker room. Unfortunately for the Lakers, their Quarterback threw an interception with 9 seconds left, giving Michigan Tech a momentum boost and a 9–3 lead heading into the locker room.

Entering the third quarter, Michigan Tech continued their momentum, with a touchdown and intercepting the Saginaw Valley State quarterback within the first four and a half minutes. Unfortunately for the Huskies, this is where their momentum started slowing down, as they allowed the Lakers to score 21 consecutive points. The last seven in this drive came when Huskies Quarterback Will Ark threw a Pick Six four minutes into the fourth quarter, giving the Lakers a 28–16 lead. Michigan Tech was able to rebound, scoring fourteen of the next twenty-one points. The Huskies had a Touchdown with 52 seconds left, putting them behind 30–35. This warranted them to attempt an onside kick, which Saginaw Valley State recovered, securing the season sweep over the Huskies.

References

Michigan Tech
Michigan Tech Huskies football seasons
Michigan Tech Huskies football